Pooran Farrokhzad (4 February 1933 – 29 December 2016) was an Iranian writer, poet, playwright, and encyclopedist. She was author of the Encyclopedia of Women Culture Makers in Iran and in the World which was the first comprehensive women's encyclopedia in Iran.

She was the daughter of Turan Vaziri Tabar (born in Tehran and Kashitbar) and Colonel Mohammad Farrokhzad (who was an educated poet-loving lieutenant from the village of Bazargan Tafresh). Pooran Farrokhzad spent her childhood in Nowshahr and other cities and grew up in Tehran. She and her siblings learned to read before going to school and became accustomed to reading books. In 1931, her father moved from Nowshahr to Tehran, and Farrokhzad studied at Jaleh and Soroush Primary School, during which time her literary talent was revealed. She also learned English at home from the age of 9 with a teacher and continued at the Parvin Cultural Association and the Iran-US Association.

Family
Farrokhzad's siblings were the poet Forugh Farrokhzad and entertainer Fereydoun Farrokhzad.
She had two daughters: Alaleh and Afsaneh.

References

External links
 Official Farrokhzad Foundation Website Maintained by her second daughter (Laleh Bahman) in Vancouver, Canada.
 Official website

20th-century Iranian poets
Iranian women poets
1933 births
2016 deaths
Iranian translators
Iranian encyclopedists
Iranian women short story writers
20th-century Iranian women writers
21st-century Iranian women writers
21st-century Iranian poets
People from Nowshahr
20th-century translators